"Dance for Me" is a 2001 single recorded by Sisqó for Def Soul. The song charted at #6 in the UK Singles chart.

Music video
Directed by Dave Meyers, the video took place in Universal Studios Florida with then-Eden's Crush's member Ivette Sosa playing the love interest.

Track listing

Chart

Weekly charts

Year-end charts

References 

2001 singles
2001 songs
Sisqó songs
Music videos directed by Dave Meyers (director)
Songs written by Rich Shelton
Songs written by Kevin Veney
Songs written by Sisqó